Mariquita Airport  is an airport serving Mariquita, a municipality of the Tolima Department in Colombia. The runway is adjacent to the north side of the town.

See also

Transport in Colombia
List of airports in Colombia

References

External links 
OpenStreetMap - Mariquita
OurAirports - Mariquita
SkyVector - Mariquita
FallingRain - Mariquita

Airports in Colombia
Buildings and structures in Tolima Department